Robert Pleasant Trippe (December 21, 1819 – July 22, 1900) was an American politician, lawyer and jurist from the state of Georgia.

Biography
Trippe was born near Monticello in Jasper County, Georgia, and later moved with his family to an area near Culloden, Georgia. He attended Randolph Macon College in Ashland, Virginia, before graduating from Franklin College at the University of Georgia in Athens in 1839. While at Franklin College, he was a member of the Phi Kappa Literary Society. He then studied law, was admitted to the state bar in 1840 and began the practice of law in Forsyth, Georgia.

In 1849, Trippe was elected to the Georgia House of Representatives and held that position until 1852 when he unsuccessfully ran for the United States House of Representatives. In 1854, he ran for the U.S. House again and was elected as an American Party candidate representing Georgia's 3rd congressional district in the 34th United States Congress. He was re-elected to the 35th Congress.

In 1858, Trippe did not seek re-election to the U.S. Congress. He was elected to the Georgia Senate that year and was re-elected in 1860. He was also elected to the First Confederate Congress. During the American Civil War, Trippe was in the Confederate States Army from 1862 to 1865. After the war, he returned to practicing law. In 1873, he became an associate justice of the Georgia Supreme Court and sat on that court until his resignation in 1875. He again returned to practicing of law in Atlanta, Georgia. On July 22, 1900, he died in Atlanta and was buried in Forsyth Cemetery in Forsyth.

References
 Retrieved October 18, 2008.

1819 births
1900 deaths
People from Jasper County, Georgia
Know-Nothing members of the United States House of Representatives from Georgia (U.S. state)
Members of the Georgia House of Representatives
Georgia (U.S. state) state senators
Georgia (U.S. state) lawyers
University of Georgia alumni
Members of the Confederate House of Representatives from Georgia (U.S. state)
Justices of the Supreme Court of Georgia (U.S. state)
Confederate States Army soldiers
People from Monroe County, Georgia
People from Forsyth, Georgia
American slave owners
19th-century American politicians
19th-century American judges
19th-century American lawyers
Members of the United States House of Representatives from Georgia (U.S. state)